Lietuvos rytas (lit. Morning of Lithuania) is a Lithuanian daily newspaper.

Lietuvos rytas may also refer to:
BC Lietuvos Rytas (primary basketball team of Vilnius carried the newspaper name from 1997 to 2018)
Lietuvos rytas TV
Lietuvos rytas Arena, Vilnius